The eleventh season of Big Brother Suomi premiered on 1 September 2019 and was aired on Jim and Nelonen. This is the first season to air on Jim and Nelonen after the first ten seasons aired on Sub from 2005–2014. After a five year hiatus the revival of Big Brother Suomi was announced on 14 January 2019 alongside the revival of the Polish edition of Big Brother.

On 9 July 2019, it was announced Elina Kottonen returned to host the main show. Daily Show co-host by Kimmo Vehviläinen and Alma Hätönen.

For this season, the Big Brother house is located next to the shopping centre Redi in Kalasatama, Helsinki. The house is designed by Finnish architect, environmental artist Marco Casagrande.

Housemates

Nominations table
The first housemate in each box was nominated for two points, and the second housemate was nominated for one point.

Note

Nominations Points Received

References

External links 
 Official website
 Big Brother Suomi at Ruutu.fi

11
2019 Finnish television seasons